Per Robert Andreas Holmqvist Pedersen (born July 23, 1981) is a Swedish ice hockey coach and former professional ice hockey defenceman. He won gold at the 2006 World Championships.

Playing career 
Holmqvist made his debut in men's ice hockey in Sweden's second-division with Hammarby IF in 2000–01. He played for Linköpings HC, Frölunda HC and Djurgårdens IF in the Swedish Elitserien, interrupted by stints in the AHL and ECHL: From 2003 to 2005, he played for the Hamilton Bulldogs, Pensacola Ice Pilots and Springfield Falcons. In 2007 and 2010, Holmqvist made it to the SHL finals with Linköping and Djurgårdens IF respectively.

He signed with Kölner Haie in the Deutsche Eishockey Liga (DEL) in 2012. He reached the DEL finals with Köln in 2013 and 2014 and was named 2013 DEL Player of the Year. He announced his retirement towards the end of the 2014–15 season.

International play 
Holmqvist played nine games during the 2006 World Championships en route to winning gold. He also played for Sweden at the 2005–06, 2006–07 and 2007–08 Euro Hockey Tour.

Coaching career 
In September 2015, he was named assistant coach of Djurgårdens IF's women's team.

Personal 
He is the younger brother of fellow hockey player Michael Holmqvist.

Career statistics

Regular season and playoffs

International

Records
Linköpings HC club record for goals in a playoff season, defenceman (4), 2006–07

References

External links

1981 births
Living people
Djurgårdens IF Hockey players
Frölunda HC players
Hamilton Bulldogs (AHL) players
Kölner Haie players
Linköping HC players
Pensacola Ice Pilots players
Springfield Falcons players
Swedish ice hockey defencemen
Swedish expatriate ice hockey players in Canada
Swedish expatriate ice hockey players in the United States
Tampa Bay Lightning draft picks
Ice hockey people from Stockholm